Oboga is a commune in Olt County, Oltenia, Romania. It is composed of a single village, Oboga. It also included Călui and Gura Căluiu villages until 2004, when they were split off to form Călui Commune.

References

Communes in Olt County
Localities in Oltenia